Chaetocerotales is an order of diatoms belonging to the class Mediophyceae.

Families:
 Acanthocerataceae
 Attheyaceae 
 Chaetocerotaceae

References

Diatoms
Diatom orders